Liebesschmerz (English: Love pain) is the second single from the 1999 Schiller debut album Zeitgeist with spoken word passages by German actor and voice actor Hans Paetsch (1909–2002). Paetsch became famous in the German-speaking countries for narrating fairy tales. The trance music single was officially released on 2 July 1999 and peaked at number 24 on German Singles Chart in 1999. The cover art shows a graphic of a heart.

An example of the spoken words:

 (Translation from German: "Love can demand anything, but could also fade".)

Track listing

Maxi single

Vinyl

Credits 

 Producer: Christopher von Deylen, Mirko von Schlieffen
 Composed by Christopher von Deylen and Mirko von Schlieffen
 Voice by Hans Paetsch
 Recorded and mixed at Sleepingroom in Hamburg

Music video 

The music video for "Liebesschmerz" was produced by Heimatfilm and was shot in 1999 by German director Marcus Sternberg. Director of photography was Gero Steffen. It has a length of 3:59 minutes. The video features performing dancers, some of them known from the music video of the single "Das Glockenspiel".

Other crew members:

 Lighting and Grip: Stefan Rüsenberg

Charts

References

External links
 Official music video of Liebesschmerz
 The music video of Liebesschmerz
 The single on Discogs

Schiller (band) songs
1999 singles
Songs written by Christopher von Deylen
1999 songs
Universal Music Group singles